Calderwood is a place-derived surname, of Brythonic and Old English origins in Lanarkshire Scotland.

History

Etymology and origins

The derivation of Calder has been described as originating from the Old English (pre 800s) 'ceald', cold and 'wudu', a wood. However, as the earliest records of this surname relate to the ancient Barony of Calderwood in Lanarkshire Scotland (A County with several Calder Rivers named at an early period) then an early dialect of Welsh (Brythonic) gives the historically sound derivation of 'Cal Dur' for 'spiritual water' or 'sounding water in the woods'.

Calderwood Castle in the opinion of many genealogical groups is thought to have been anciently possessed by a family bearing the name Calderwood. In fact Calderwood is so ancient a title that it predates Castles in their modern interpretation. The documents regarding the ancient lands of Calderwood and family are scarce, but do suggest that the name descends from a small village or possibly a defended iron-age town (oppidum) as referred to in marriage charters. There were several Calderwood landholdings in the area, and the retainers on the lands would have gone by this name'.

Alleged loss of Calderwood Estate by the Calderwood family

Anecdotally in the work 'History of Rutherglen & East Kilbride, 1793, he describes an old story handed down by country folk bearing the name of Calderwood at that time in the Shire of Ayr.'In this work a tradition is given as to the estate of Calderwood having been possessed by a family of that surname from time immemorial. This family at last, consisted of 3 sons and a daughter. The sons having unhappily quarreled with the priest of the parish and finding it not safe to remain any longer in Calderwood, fled to the Earl of Cassilis for protection who gave them the farms of Peacockbank and Moss-side in the parish of Stewarton, and 40 acre lands in Kyle. The sister who was left in Kilbride, was married to a Maxwell, and got by the marriage, the whole of her fathers estate.' Since this anecdote does not appear to rely on any existing primary evidence, and as primary evidence itself negates the story by proving the estate of Calderwood came to the Maxwells via a marriage to the McGauckhin Family of Mearns Barony, it would appear it bears little truth. These take the form of early references in the British Library to such a marriage, although no document mentioning Calderwood and Mearns Barony are known. Surnames were assumed from places as well as professions, and within a strict historical context all that can be concluded at this time is that people descending 'of' Calderwood, either retainers or bonnet lairds within the lairdship, and perhaps many unrelated persons, adopted this surname at an early period. Sir Aymer de Maxwell (1200-1264), the Great Chamberlin of Scotland who gained several Sheriffdoms, was the father of Sir John Maxwell of Pollok,  also known as Sir John Maxwell of Calderwood (b. 1243), who was the first likely owner of Calderwood Barony from c. 1270 to 1306. The first Maxwell castle was built after the year 1400 when it became a distinct lairdship from Pollok in need of protection as a family seat of the newly created 'Maxwells of Calderwood. This building may have occupied the site of an earlier defensive structure, as Calderwood is mentioned in the 1296 Ragman's Roll and the promontory is the only natural place in the area which lends itself to defence, although its visual prospect is greatly limited. The Building went through a series of changes over the centuries, with the most recent gothic revival edifice being was sold in 1904 to the Scottish Co-operative Wholesale Society, then the UK Government, private ownership, and finally the East Kilbride Development Corporation, who demolished the last traces of the Victorian mansion in 1951.

Distribution
As a surname, Calderwood  is the 77,052th most common name in the world with 5,744 bearers. Although originating in Lanarkshire, Scotland, it is found mostly in the United States, England, Scotland and Australia respectively. Other notable concentrations include South Africa, Canada, Northern Ireland and New Zealand. Currently, it ranks at 14,538 in the U.S.

Notable people with the surname include:
 Andrea Calderwood, British film and television producer
 Catherine Calderwood, medical consultant from Northern Ireland, and former Chief Medical Officer for Scotland
 Chic Calderwood (1937–1966), Scottish light-heavyweight boxer
 Colin Calderwood, Scottish football player and manager
 David Calderwood, Scottish minister and historian
 Gary Calderwood, American art collector and dealer 
 Henry Calderwood (1830–1897), Scottish minister and philosopher
 Jimmy Calderwood, Scottish football player and manager
 Joanne Calderwood, Scottish Muay Thai fighter and mixed martial artist
 John Calderwood, Scottish American miner and labor union leader
 John Lindow Calderwood (1888–1960), English solicitor, British Army officer and later independent politician
 Mark Calderwood, English rugby league footballer
 Matt Calderwood, artist from Northern Ireland
 Nora Calderwood (1896-1985), Scottish professor
 Robert Calderwood (fl. 1885), Scottish football player
 Robert S. Calderwood, church Minister at Cambuslang, Scotland
 Sarah Calderwood, Australian singer-songwriter, flautist
 Scott Calderwood, British-Dutch football player
 Stewart Calderwood (1905–1973), Scottish football player
 Tyra Calderwood, Australian tennis player

References

Surnames
Surnames of Scottish origin